is the eighth album by Yui Horie.  It was released on February 22, 2012, as a standard edition and two limited editions, that came in a "Spring-Summer" or "Winter" variation.

The album achieved a peak position of third in the Oricon Charts, staying in the chart for six weeks.

Track listing
秘密～プロローグ～ (Himitsu ~Prologue~)
kiss to you
Coloring
 Ending theme song for Listen to Me, Girls. I Am Your Father!
True truly love
 Theme song for the online game Divina (defunct as of November 2014) 
秘密～君を見てた～ (Himitsu-Kimi wo Miteta-) 
イマカラキミノモトヘ (Ima Kara Kimi no Moto he)
PRESENTER
 Ending theme for song anime Dog Days
インモラリスト (Immoralist)
 Opening theme song for anime Dragon Crisis!
MISSION
DEAR FUTURE 
 Ending theme song for anime Penguindrum - Episode 10
CHILDISH♥LOVE♥WORLD
YAHHO!!
 Ending theme song for anime Kanamemo
sky fish
秘密～待ち合わせ～ (Himitsu ~Machiawase~)

References

Yui Horie albums
2012 albums